The I European Union Piano Competition took place in Prague and Ostrava from June 24–29, 2009, as part of the cultural program accompanying the Czech Presidency of the Council of the European Union. It was jointly organized by the International Dvořák Society and European Piano Teachers Association (EPTA). The purpose of the competition was to deepen the cultural integration of the member states  and to find the most promising young pianist of the European Union. The selection of the candidates (first round) was provided with the help of embassies, Ministries of Culture, EPTA organizations, and leading European music schools and institutions. Only candidates delegated from those authorities were accepted to participate, one candidate for each EU country. A total of 27 pianists were accepted to the Semi-final Round in Prague, which consisted of a 60-minute piano recital, performed at the Nostitz Palace. Four finalists where then chosen to perform with one of the leading Czech orchestras, the Janáček Philharmonic Orchestra (formerly known as the Czech Radio Orchestra), in a concert broadcast by both Czech Television and Czech Radio. Pianist Josu de Solaun Soto was given the First Prize and Audience Prize. The prize included a cash award and a string of recital and orchestral engagements.

Jury

  Radoslav Kvapil (president)
 Justas Dvarionas
 Diane Andersen
 Walter Groppenberger
 Peep Lassmann
 Malcolm Troup

Prizes

First Prize ------  Josu de Solaun Soto
Second Prize -------------  Matej Arendárik
Finalist Diploma (ex-aequo) -------  Fiachra Garvey             -----                 Raul Peixoto Da Costa
Audience Prize (by vote)------------------------------------------------------------   Josu de Solaun Soto

Competition results (by rounds)

First round

After a three-month-long screening process, 27 pianists were selected to participate, one candidate for each EU country. The selection of candidates for this first round was provided with the help of Ministries of Culture and other organizations.

Semi-final round
June 24–27, Nostitz Palace, Prague

 Andreas Eggertsberger
 Rafael Theissen
 Victoria Vassilenko
 Eleni Mavromoustaki
 Ladislav Dolezel
 Kristoffer Nyholm Hyldig
 Maksim Stsura
 Maija Vaisanen
 Nairi Badal
 Felix Wahl
 Maria Stratigou
 Istvan Lajko
Fiachra Garvey
 Ruta Birzule
 Sonata Alsauskaite-Mikule
 Jean Muller
 Alexei Galea
 Nicolas van Poucke
 Raul Peixoto da Costa
 Ivan Fercic
 Matej Arendarik
 Josu de Solaun Soto
 Peter Friis Johansson
 Mishka Rushdie Momen

Final round
June 29, Great Hall, Culture Palace, Ostrava

 Josu de Solaun Soto --- Sergei Rachmaninov: Concerto for piano and orchestra nº3
Fiachra Garvey --- Sergei Rachmaninov: Rhapsody on a Theme by Paganini
 Matej Arendarik --- Antonín Dvořák: Concerto for piano and orchestra
 Raul Peixoto da Costa --- Frédéric Chopin: Concerto for piano and orchestra nº1

Janáček Philharmonic Orchestra. Theodore Kuchar, conductor.

See also
 Josu De Solaun Soto

External links
 Article in Czech about the I EU Piano Competition
 Article in German about the I EU Piano Competition
 Article in Spanish about the I EU Piano Competition

European Union
Music competitions in the Czech Republic